The Dangi Canyon is a narrow passage of the river Aravansay in the Nookat District, Osh Region of southwestern Kyrgyzstan. It is situated to the south of Aravan and to the north of Nookat. It is a natural monument and a protected area. In the canyon are a series of caves: 
Fersman cave
Surprise cave
Victory cave
Ajydaar-Üngkür
Baryte cave

References

External links
 Dangi Canyon

Biosphere reserves of Kyrgyzstan
Natural monuments of Kyrgyzstan
Osh Region
Protected areas established in 1959